She's Got Everything is a 1937 American romantic comedy directed by Joseph Santley using a screenplay by Harry Segall and Maxwell Shane, based on a story by Shane and Joseph Hoffman. The film stars Gene Raymond and Ann Sothern, with supporting performances by Victor Moore, Helen Broderick, Parkyakarkus (also known by his real name, Harry Einstein), and Billy Gilbert. RKO Radio Pictures produced and distributed the picture, which was released on the final day of 1937.

Plot summary
Heiress Carol Rogers returns from a long overseas vacation to learn her father has died and saddled her with a mountain of debt. To keep her creditors at bay, her Aunt Jane and pal Waldo contrive to get her hired as an assistant to wealthy coffee magnate Fuller Partridge, hoping it will lead to love and eventually marriage. Unfortunately, the plan is beset by obstacles, especially when a bumbling hypnotist hired to put a romance spell on Carol misses and casts it on Aunt Jane instead.

Cast
 Gene Raymond as Fuller Partridge
 Ann Sothern as Carol Rogers
 Victor Moore as Waldo Eddington - a Bookie
 Helen Broderick as Aunt Jane Carter
 Harry Parke as Nick Zyteras (as Parkyakarkus)
 Billy Gilbert as Chaffee - a Creditor
 William Brisbane as Roger - aka Madame Helene
 Solly Ward as Professor Alphonso Alberto Corrio

References

External links
 
 
 
 

1937 romantic comedy films
American romantic comedy films
Films directed by Joseph Santley
American black-and-white films
RKO Pictures films
1937 films
1930s American films